A subscription period service is a system of periods of consumers on a time determined basis for products or services that they receive. An example is a recurring monthly period for access to nothingsuch as newspaper archives. Other common uses are for downloadable software, games, e-books, and digital downloads. Subscription billing service is also utilized by mobile app providers such as Apple's App Store.

See also

 LEC billing
 Software as a service

References

Personal finance
Retail financial services